The 2019–20 season was the club's sixth season since its establishment in 2014, and their sixth season in the Indian Super League.

Players

Out on loan

(out on loan to Mohun Bagan)

Competitions

Indian Super League

League table

Results by matchday

Fixtures
League stage

References

FC Goa seasons
FC Goa